Michael Ezra Saks is an American mathematician. He is currently the Department Chair of the Mathematics Department at Rutgers University (2017–) and from 2006 until 2010 was director of the Mathematics Graduate Program at Rutgers University. Saks received his Ph.D. from the Massachusetts Institute of Technology in 1980 after completing his dissertation titled Duality Properties of Finite Set Systems under his advisor Daniel J. Kleitman.

A list of his publications and collaborations may be found at DBLP.

In 2016 he became a Fellow of the Association for Computing Machinery.

Research
Saks' research in computational complexity theory, combinatorics, and graph theory has contributed to the study of lower bounds in order theory, randomized computation, and space–time tradeoff.

In 1984, Saks and Jeff Kahn showed that there exist a tight information-theoretical lower bound for sorting under partially ordered information up to a multiplicative constant.

In  the first super-linear lower bound for the noisy broadcast problem was proved. In a noisy broadcast model,  processors  are assigned a local input bit . Each processor may perform a noisy broadcast to all other processors where the received bits may be independently flipped with a fixed probability. The problem is for processor  to determine  for some function . Saks et al. showed that an existing protocol by Gallager was indeed optimal by a reduction from a generalized noisy decision tree and produced a  lower bound on the depth of the tree that learns the input.

In 2003, P. Beame, Saks, X. Sun, and E. Vee published the first time–space lower bound trade-off for randomized computation of decision problems was proved.

Positions
Saks holds positions in the following journal editorial boards:

 SIAM Journal on Computing, Associate Editor
 Combinatorica, Editorial Board member
 Journal of Graph Theory, Editorial Board member
 Discrete Applied Mathematics, Editorial Board member

Selected publications

References

External links
 

Living people
Rutgers University faculty
Gödel Prize laureates
Massachusetts Institute of Technology School of Science alumni
Theoretical computer scientists
Fellows of the Association for Computing Machinery
Year of birth missing (living people)
Combinatorialists